Al Ahed Stadium is a football field located in the Al-Ouzai area of Bourj el-Barajneh, in the southern suburbs of Beirut, Lebanon. The stadium can accommodate about 2,000 spectators, and is of Al Ahed FC's property, who uses it as a training ground.

In 2018, Israeli prime minister Benjamin Netanyahu accused Hezbollah, a Shia political party and militant group based in Lebanon, in a speech of using the Al Ahed Stadium as a missile cluster. Gebran Bassil, the Lebanese Minister of Foreign Affairs, denied the claims.

References

Sport in Beirut
Buildings and structures in Beirut
Football venues in Beirut
Athletics (track and field) venues in Lebanon
Lebanon
Multi-purpose stadiums in Lebanon